Gustavus Vasa Fox (June 13, 1821 – October 29, 1883) was an officer of the United States Navy, who served during the Mexican–American War, and as Assistant Secretary of the Navy during the Civil War.

Life and career
Fox was born at Saugus, Massachusetts, attended Lowell High School Lowell, Massachusetts from 1836-1838. On January 12, 1838, Fox was appointed midshipman. During the Mexican–American War, he served in the brig  in the squadron of Commodore Matthew Perry, and took part in the capture of Tabasco, Mexico, on January 14–16, 1847. He later commanded several mail steamers. He resigned from the Navy on July 30, 1856, and engaged in the manufacture of woolen materials.

At the start of the American Civil War he volunteered for service. President Abraham Lincoln gave him a temporary appointment in the Navy and sent him in the steamer Baltic to the relief of Fort Sumter. Fox could not relieve the fort before Confederate bombardment forced its surrender, but afterwards he brought away the garrison.

On August 1, 1861, Lincoln appointed him Assistant Secretary of the Navy, an office which he held until the close of the Civil War. In 1866, he was sent on a special mission to Russia; he conveyed the congratulations of the President to Tsar Alexander II upon his escape from assassination. His voyage was made in the monitor , which was the first vessel of this class to cross the Atlantic.

In 1882 he published a paper suggesting that Samana Cay in the Bahamas was Guanahani, or San Salvador, the first island Christopher Columbus reached in his discovery of the Americas. Little attention was paid to his paper until 1986, when the National Geographic Society also concluded that Samana Cay was San Salvador.

He died at Lowell, Massachusetts, aged 62.

Tributes and legacy
Three ships of the US Navy – TB-13, DD-234 and CG-33 – have been named  in his memory.

In popular culture
Fox is one of the primary viewpoint characters in novelist Harry Harrison's alternate history Stars and Stripes trilogy.

Publications
 Fox, Gustavus V. (1882), An Attempt to Solve the Problem of the First Landing Place of Columbus in the New World. Report of the Superintendent of the U. S. Coast and Geodetic Survey (Appendix No. 18, June 1880), Washington: Government Printing Office.

References

Further reading

External links

 The Gustavus Vasa Fox Collection 1823-1919 at the New York Historical Society

 Mr. Lincoln's White House

1821 births
1883 deaths
People of Massachusetts in the American Civil War
Union Navy officers
United States Navy officers
People from Saugus, Massachusetts
People from Lowell, Massachusetts
Phillips Academy alumni
United States Assistant Secretaries of the Navy
Burials at Rock Creek Cemetery